Chaetopsis aenea is a species of ulidiid or picture-winged fly in the genus Chaetopsis of the family Ulidiidae.

References

aenea
Insects described in 1830